WTOY (1480 kHz) is an Urban Adult Contemporary and Urban Gospel formatted radio station licensed to Salem, Virginia, and serving Roanoke County, Virginia.  WTOY is owned by Ward Broadcast Corporation.

By day, WTOY is powered at 5,000 watts non-directional.  But to protect other stations on 1480 AM from interference, at night it greatly reduces power to 20 watts.

History

WTOY failed to file an application when its license was due for renewal in 2019, and it expired on October 1. Upon receiving notice of the license expiration, Irwin Ward's estate filed a renewal and requested to authorize its operations under special temporary authority on November 7.  The applications claimed that sole owner Irvin Ward died on August 18 and no one in his family or estate was aware of the upcoming renewal. The Federal Communications Commission reinstated the license with a $7,000 fine for the five weeks of unauthorized operation on June 4, 2020.

References

TOY
Radio stations established in 1956
1956 establishments in Virginia